Alberto Tous Aguiló (born 3 August 1962) is a former professional tennis player from Spain.

Career
Born in Palma, Majorca, Balearic Islands, Tous was the top ranked Spanish junior in 1979. He made the final of the boys' singles event at the 1980 French Open, which he lost to Henri Leconte.

He reached the quarterfinals at Madrid in 1983 and made two Grand Slam appearances that year. He took part in a Davis Cup tie for his country that year against Yugoslavia.

In 1984, his best result of the year came in Bari, where he reached the quarterfinals.

He made two Grand Prix finals in 1985, at Madrid and Bologna, both in the doubles. As a singles player, he did well in Bologna, making the semifinals.

Tous had his most notable performance in the 1987 French Open, where he reached the semifinals of the men's doubles with José López-Maeso. They lost their semifinal in five sets to eventual champions Anders Järryd and Robert Seguso.

Grand Prix career finals

Doubles: 2 (0–2)

Challenger titles

Singles: (3)

Doubles: (2)

References

1962 births
Living people
Spanish male tennis players
Sportspeople from Palma de Mallorca
Tennis players from the Balearic Islands